Muhammad Nazrul bin Kamaruzaman (born 29 March 1993) is a Malaysian footballer who plays as a striker Malaysia M3 League club KSR Sains.

Club careers
A product of Bukit Jalil Sports School, Nazrul has played for Harimau Muda B and the youth team of Selangor FA. He left Selangor at the end of 2013, never having played for the first team despite becoming top scorer for the Selangor youth team (18 goals) in the 2013 Malaysia President Cup. Subsequently, in 2014 Nazrul joined cross-town team, Kuala Lumpur based Sime Darby F.C., where he made his senior professional debut. His first senior goal was scored in a 3–2 win against league leaders at the time Terengganu FA on 22 March 2014.

Career statistics

Club

Honours
Sime Darby
 Malaysia FAM League: 2017
Felcra
 Malaysia Premier League runners-up: 2018

References

External links
 Selangor's forgotten player
 2014 Stats at Stadium Astro Fantasy Football
 
 Profile at Sime Darby FC official website

1993 births
Association football forwards
Living people
Malaysian footballers
People from Selangor
Selangor FA players
Sime Darby F.C. players
Negeri Sembilan FA players
Felcra FC players
Malaysia Super League players